According to the California Protected Areas Database (CPAD), in the state of California, United States, there are over 14,000 inventoried protected areas  administered by public agencies and non-profits. In addition, there are private conservation areas and other easements.  They include almost one-third of California's scenic coastline, including  coastal wetlands, estuaries, beaches, and dune systems. The California State Parks system alone has 270 units and covers 1.3 million acres (5,300 km2), with over 280 miles (450 km) of coastline, 625 miles (1,006 km) of lake and river frontage, nearly 18,000 campsites, and 3,000 miles (5,000 km) of hiking, biking, and equestrian trails.

Obtaining an accurate total of all protected land in California and elsewhere is a complex task. Many parcels have inholdings, private lands within the protected areas, which may or may not be accounted for when calculating total area. Also, occasionally one parcel of land is included in two or more inventories. Over 90% of Yosemite National Park for example, is listed both as wilderness by the National Wilderness Preservation System, and as national park land by the National Park Service. The Cosumnes River Preserve is an extreme example, owned and managed by a handful of public agencies and private landowners, including the Bureau of Land Management, the County of Sacramento and The Nature Conservancy.

National Park System

The U.S. National Park System controls a large and diverse group of California parks, monuments, recreation areas and other units which in total exceed . The best known is Yosemite National Park, noted for several iconic natural features including Yosemite Falls, El Capitan and Half Dome, which is displayed on the reverse side of the California state quarter. Other prominent parks are the Kings Canyon-Sequoia National Park complex, Redwood National Park, Channel Islands National Park, Joshua Tree National Park and the largest, Death Valley National Park. The NPS also administers the Manzanar National Historic Site in Inyo County.

National Landscape Conservation System

The Bureau of Land Management’s National Landscape Conservation System (NLCS) includes over 850 federally recognized areas and in California, manages  of public lands, nearly 15% of the state's land area.
The National Landscape Conservation System is composed of several types of units: national monuments (distinct from the same-named units within the National Park System), national conservation areas, forest reserves, outstanding natural areas, national scenic and historic trails, wilderness, wilderness study areas, and others.

National Marine Sanctuaries

The National Marine Sanctuary System is managed by the Office of Marine Sanctuaries, of the National Oceanic and Atmospheric Administration.
California has four of the thirteen U.S. National Marine Sanctuaries: 

 Channel Islands National Marine Sanctuary 
 Cordell Bank National Marine Sanctuary 
 Gulf of the Farallones National Marine Sanctuary 

National Wildlife Refuges

National Wildlife Refuge (NWR) is a designation for certain protected areas of the United States managed by the United States Fish and Wildlife Service. The National Wildlife Refuge System is an extensive system of public lands and waters set aside to conserve America's fish, wildlife and plants. Many of the state's refuges are important stops and destinations for millions of migrating birds along the Pacific Flyway corridor. One, the Butte Sink Wildlife Management Area, has the highest density of waterfowl in the world. There are 38 units in the refuge system in California, including both wildlife refuges and wildlife management areas, divided into 9 different regional areas.

Wild and Scenic rivers

Rivers designated as Wild and Scenic are administered by one of four federal land management agencies: The Bureau of Land Management, The National Park Service, The U.S. Fish and Wildlife Service or The U.S. Forest Service. There are 22 rivers in California with portions designated as Wild and Scenic, with 23 designations in all (the American River has two separate designations, one for the North Fork, and one for the Lower section). Listed in miles.

National Wilderness Preservation System

National Forests

California has 17 U.S. National Forests, one special management unit (Lake Tahoe) and parts of 3 other National Forests. The Lake Tahoe Basin Management Unit is not precisely a national forest in the conventional sense. Instead the Forest Service manages the land with particular attention paid to Lake Tahoe and its relationship with the forests surrounding it, with emphasis on erosion control management and watershed restoration, among other more conventional forest management activities.

State Forests

The California Department of Forestry and Fire Protection (CAL FIRE) operates eight Demonstration State Forests totaling 71,000 acres. The forests represent the most common forest types in the state. The State Forests grow approximately 75 million board feet of timber annually and harvest an average of 30 million board feet each year, enough to build 3,000 single-family homes. Revenue from these harvests fund the management of the State Forests. In addition, the forests provide research and demonstration opportunities for natural resource management, while providing public recreation opportunities, fish and wildlife habitat, and watershed protection. Activities include: experimental timber harvesting techniques, watershed restoration, mushroom collecting, hunting, firewood gathering, cone collecting for seed, a variety of university research projects, horseback riding, camping, mountain biking, and hiking.

State parks

State wilderness areas

Department of Fish and Wildlife Protected Areas

Municipal parks

Privately owned preserves

Largest land owners of protected lands
The 20 largest landholders, according to the CPAD 2018a Statistics Report:

References

 
Protected areas
California